Is It ... Man Or Astroman? was the first album released by the surf rock group Man or Astro-man?.  First pressing was on clear blue vinyl; all subsequent pressings were on black vinyl. In deference to "vinyl junkies", the vinyl release sports two additional tracks. "Illudium Q-36" references the Chuck Jones character, Marvin the Martian. The title refers to the weapon of choice of the hostile Looney Tunes alien.  The cover art was painted by American science fiction and fantasy illustrator Richard Powers

Track listing

CD release
 "Taxidermist Surf" – 2:53
 "Invasion of the Dragonmen" – 2:15
 "Nitrous Burn Out" – 3:17
 "Clean up on Aisle #9 (Turn up the Monitors)" – 2:35
 "Journey to the Stars" (The Ventures) – 2:28
 "Cowboy Playing Dead" – 1:55
 "Sadie Hawkins Atom Bomb" – 2:46
 "The Human Calculator" – 2:56
 "Organ Smash" – 1:46
 "Cattle Drive" – 2:51
 "Escape Through the Air Vent" – 2:23
 "Mermaid Love" – 3:21
 "Eric Estrotica" – 3:23
 "Alien Visitors" – 6:54

Vinyl release
 "Taxidermist Surf" – 2:53
 "Invasion of the Dragonmen" – 2:15
 "Nitrous Burn Out" – 3:17
 "Clean up on Aisle #9 (Turn up the Monitors)" – 2:35
 "Journey to the Stars" (The Ventures) – 2:28
 "Cowboy Playing Dead" – 1:55
 "Illidium Q-36" [bonus track] – 1:08
 "Sadie Hawkins Atom Bomb" – 2:46
 "The Human Calculator" – 2:56
 "Organ Smash" – 1:46
 "Cattle Drive" – 2:51
 "Escape Through the Air Vent" – 2:23
 "Rudy's Lounge" [bonus track] – 2:24
 "Mermaid Love" – 3:21
 "Eric Estrotica" – 3:23
 "Alien Visitors" – 6:54

Man or Astro-Man? could be
Star Crunch: guitar, laserguns, Q-Tips and rare obligatory vocals
Dr. Deleto & His Invisible Vaportron: bass, sterilized rhythm guitar, malpractice suits, and the two-step
Coco, The Electronic Monkey Wizard: alternate universe bass, percussion, banana consumption, sound bites of lower primate love, hand held view master, VCR ignition, bunny control, foreign language count-offs, and yelps of intense pain given to him, sometimes in punishment
Birdstuff: hi-hat
Grand Master Useless: imitation ivory ticklin' on Organ Smash, bass on Sadie Hawkins Atomic Bomb and Illidium Q-36

Also credited
B-movie actor John Agar is credited "because his name is in everything else".

Audio samples
Alien Visitors contains dialogue audio samples from the b-movies Earth vs. the Flying Saucers, Plan 9 from Outer Space, and the television series The Outer Limits. Nitrous Burn Out contains dialogue from the movies Viva Knievel! and Death Race 2000.

Notes

Man or Astro-man? albums
1993 albums